Alvin Boyd Cardwell (October 16, 1902, Oral, Roane County, Tennessee – September 8, 1992, Kingston, Tennessee) was an American experimental physicist, specializing in "thermionic and photoelectric emission of electrons from crystalline metals."

Biography
A. B. Cardwell graduated in 1925 with a bachelor's degree from the University of Chattanooga. At the University of Wisconsin–Madison he graduated in physics with an M.S. in 1927 and a Ph.D. in 1930. His Ph.D. thesis was published in the Proceedings of the National Academy of Sciences. In December 1930 in Roane County, Tennessee, he married Edna Evangeline Zirkle. At Tulane University he was an assistant professor from 1930 to 1935 and an associate professor from 1935 to 1936. In January 1936 he was elected a Fellow of the American Physical Society.

At Kansas State University (KSU) he was the head of the physics department from 1936 to 1944 and from 1946 to 1952. From 1944 to 1946 he was on leave absence to work on the Manhattan Project in Oak Ridge, Tennessee. During the late 1930s until his departure from Kansas in 1944 he was the volunteer weather observer for the United States Weather Bureau. From April 1939 to 1944 the official weather station was in the backyard of Alvin and Edna Cardwell's home at 1928 Humboldt Street in Manhattan, Kansas.

After WW II, as head of KSU's physics department, Cardwell hired several young physicists with doctoral degrees. These physicists established physics research at KSU and in the late 1940s the department was authorized to grant M.S. and Ph.D. degrees.

From 1952 to 1955 Cardwell was an associate dean in KSU's School of Arts & Sciences. In 1955 an illness made him incapable of continuing as associate dean. Upon his recovery he returned to the physics department and in 1957 resumed the departmental headship, continuing in that capacity until 1967. He remained a faculty member until 1972 when he retired as professor emeritus. In 1972, he and his wife returned to Tennessee. The couple had two children.

Selected publications

References

1902 births
1992 deaths
20th-century American physicists
Manhattan Project people
University of Tennessee at Chattanooga alumni
University of Wisconsin–Madison alumni
Tulane University faculty
Kansas State University faculty
Fellows of the American Physical Society
People from Roane County, Tennessee